Stuart Moore is an American writer and editor of comic books and novels.

Career

Stuart Moore's writing includes Civil War, the first in a line of prose novels from Marvel Comics, and two stories for Amazon's Kindle Worlds program: X-O Manowar: Noughts and Crosses and Shadowman: Sunshine and Shadow. Other prose novels include American Meat, Reality Bites, and John Carter: The Movie Novelization. His comics and graphic novel work includes the original science-fiction series Earthlight, Shadrach Stone, and PARA; Web of Spider-Man, Namor: The First Mutant, and Wolverine Noir (Marvel); Firestorm and Detective Comics (DC Comics); the multicultural superhero team The 99; the comics adaptation of the bestselling novel Redwall; assorted Star Trek, Transformers, and Stargate projects; and two volumes of the award-winning The Nightmare Factory.

Stuart is also a freelance editor and partner in Botfriend, a graphic novel packaging company. He has worked as a book editor at St. Martin’s Press, publishing a wide variety of science fiction and pop culture books. More recently he has served as editor of the Virgin Comics / SciFi Channel comics line and of the bestselling Marvel Knights imprint. At DC Comics, Stuart was a founding editor of the acclaimed Vertigo imprint, where he won the Will Eisner award for Best Editor 1996 and the Don Thompson Award for Favorite Editor 1999.

Bibliography

Comics
Para (Penny-Farthing Press)
Zendra (Penny-Farthing Press)
Lone (with Jerome Opena, Dark Horse Comics/Rocket Comics, 6-issue mini-series, tpb, 152 pages, 2004)
Giant Robot Warriors (with Ryan Kelly, AiT/Planet Lar, tpb, 120 pages, 2004)
 "Escapist 2966" (with Steve Conley, in Michael Chabon Presents: The Amazing Adventures of the Escapist #4, Dark Horse, 80 pages, 2004, collected in Michael Chabon Presents: The Amazing Adventures of the Escapist Vol. 2, 160 pages, 2004)
Justice League Adventures (DC Comics)
 "Pieces De Rechange (Spare Parts)" (with Cully Hamner, in Metal Hurlant magazine anthology, 2005)
 "Other Folks' Troubles" (with Jason Copland in Western Tales of Terror anthology, 2005)
Firestorm #14–32 (with Jamal Igle, Keith Champagne, and Rob Stull, DC Comics)
 "Wolverine: The Healing" (with C. P. Smith, in X-Men Unlimited #12, Marvel Comics, 2006)
 "Wolverine: The Package" (with C. P. Smith, in Wolverine #41, Marvel Comics, 2006)
Earthlight (with Christopher Schons, two volumes, Tokyopop, volume 1, 195 pages, October 2006)
Stargate Atlantis: Wraithfall (with Mauricio Melo, Avatar Press, 2006)
JSA Classified #10–13 (with Paul Gulacy and Jimmy Palmiotti, DC Comics, 2006)
Legion of Superheroes (various stories, DC Comics, 2006)
Punisher X-Mas Special (with C. P. Smith, Marvel Comics, 2006)
 "Tic Tac Bang Bang" (with Michael Gaydos, in Postcards anthology, Villard, 2007)
Redwall (adapted from the novel by Brian Jacques, art by Bret Blevins, Philomel, 2007)
 "Batman: The Siege" (with Andy Clarke, in Detective Comics #829–830, DC Comics, 2007)
The Nightmare Factory (adapted from the works of Thomas Ligotti, two volumes, HarperCollins/Fox Atomic Comics, 2007–2008)
  "Spider-Man: Unfriendly Neighborhood" (with Clayton Henry and Mark Morales, in Marvel Comics Presents #1, Marvel Comics, 2006)
New Avengers U.S. Military special editions #4–6 (Marvel Comics, 2006–2008)
 "Stardust: A Death of Hope" with Mike McKone, in Annihilation: Heralds of Galactus, 2007 (Marvel Comics)
Ghost Rider Annual #1 (with Ben Oliver, Marvel Comics, 2007)
The 99 (Teshkeel Media, 2007–2013)
New Avengers/Transformers (with Tyler Kirkham, 2007, Marvel Comics)
Transformers Spotlight: Ramjet (with Robby Musso, IDW Publishing, 2007)
Iron Man: Director of S.H.I.E.L.D. #29–32 (Marvel Comics, 2008)
 "Termite Blues" (with Alberto Ponticelli, in Creature Features #2, Th3rd Eye Studios, 2008)
Spider-Man: Fear Itself (with Joe Suitor, Marvel Comics, 2009)
Wolverine Noir (with C. P. Smith, Marvel Comics, 2009)
Star Trek Alien Spotlight: Tribbles (IDW, 2009)
Wolverine: Under the Boardwalk (Marvel, 2010)
The Golden Age Deadpool in Captain America: Who Won't Wear the Shield? (Marvel, 2010)
Spider-Man: Back in Quack (with Howard the Duck) (Marvel, 2010)
Cloak and Dagger (Marvel, 2010)
X-Men Origins: Cyclops (Marvel, 2010)
Deadpool Team-Up #896 (Marvel, 2010)
Star Trek Captain's Log: Pike (IDW, 2010)
Namor: The First Mutant (Marvel, 2010 – 2011)
Conan: The Mask of Acheron (Dark Horse, 2011)
Wolverine/Deadpool: The Decoy (Marvel, 2011)
JLA/THE 99 (DC/Teshkeel, 2010–2011)
Shells in X-Men: To Serve and Protect (Marvel, 2011)
Web of Spider-Man (Marvel, 2012)

Novels
Civil War: A Novel of the Marvel Universe (Marvel Entertainment, 2012)
John Carter: The Movie Novelization (Disney Editions, 2012)
Black Flame's Dark Future series:
American Meat (October 2005)
Reality Bites: In the Jungle No-one Can Hear You Scream (October 2006)
"Zodiac legacy:Convergence"[The Zodiac Legacy series] (Published January 27, 2015)(2016 Disney Enterprise,Inc)  
"Zodiac Legacy: the Dragon's Return"[The Zodiac Legacy series] (Published January 26, 2016)(2016 Disney Enterprise,Inc) 
"Zodiac Legacy:the Age of Bronze"[the Zodiac Legacy series] 
Thanos: Death Sentence (Marvel Comics, 2017)

References

External links

Interview with Stuart Moore Part One, Two
Video Interview
Para's page at PF Press
Review of Para
Wraithfall page at Avatar Press
A Man for All Genres: Stuart Moore, Comics Bulletin, September 26, 2007

American comics writers
Living people
DC Comics people
Year of birth missing (living people)